Twirl may refer to:

 TWIRL, The Weizmann Institute Relation Locator, a hypothetical hardware device
Earl "the Twirl" Williams (born 1951), American-Israeli basketball player
 Twirl (chocolate bar), a brand of chocolate bar manufactured by Cadbury
 Twirl (film), a 1981 movie about baton twirlers starring Erin Moran
 Angular impulse, the change in angular momentum or the angular analog of impulse.

See also
 Twirling
 Spin (disambiguation)